St. Rose's High School is a government secondary school on Church Street in Georgetown, Guyana, serving students in grades 7-12 in Georgetown, Guyana. To be accepted into the school, the student must receive a certain grade in their Secondary Schools Entrance Examination (SSEE).

History
The Ursuline Order of Nuns who run the academy has been involved in education in Guyana as early as 1847. St. Rose was named for Saint Rose of Lima and  considered one of the top 5 schools in Georgetown. In 1976 the government took over operations of all educational institutions.

The section of the school built in 1912 was set for demolition in 2018. Some of the schools buildings are considered a national heritage site by the National Trust of Guyana St. Rose shares the compound with the St. Agnes Primary.

Student organizations and traditions
St. Rose's students are sorted into five houses; Brescia, Cologne, Lima, Loretto, Merici.

School athletics includes basketball, football, and extra curriculars such as  participating in the biennial STEAM Fair, and a speech team.

Alumni
The St. Rose's High School Alumni Association has chapters located in the US and Canada.

Notable alumni
 Joy Ford Austin (graduated 1968), non-profit executive and philanthropist.

References

Educational institutions established in 1847
High schools and secondary schools in Guyana
1847 establishments in the British Empire
Buildings and structures in Georgetown, Guyana